"Glorious Mind" is Zard's 43rd and first posthumous single by Japanese band Zard. It was released single on December 12, 2007 through B-Gram Records label.

Background
The song was the last song recorded by Izumi Sakai before she died. Although the song was not complete at the time of Izumi Sakai's death, the chorus part had been recorded with assistance of Yuri Nakamura from Japanese pop band Garnet Crow. The extra minutes recorded in English were from another unrelated and unreleased song.

The song was used as a 21st opening theme song of Detective Conan.

Oricon Charting
The single debuted at number 2 on the Japanese Oricon weekly charts with the debut week sales of around 50,000 copies.

Track listing 
All songs are written by Izumi Sakai and arranged by Takeshi Hayama

References

2007 singles
2007 songs
Zard songs
Case Closed songs
Songs released posthumously
Songs written by Izumi Sakai
Songs written by Aika Ohno
Song recordings produced by Daiko Nagato